Declan Dunn (born 8 October 2000) is an English professional footballer who plays as a defender for Basford United.

Playing career
Dunn joined the youth-team at Notts County at under-10 level. He made his senior debut for the "Magpies" on 10 November 2018, coming on as an 82nd-minute substitute for Cedric Evina in a 4–0 defeat at Barnsley in the FA Cup. He signed his first professional contract at Meadow Lane nine days later; he stated that "It's a massive weight lifted off my shoulders because it's something I've wanted for a long time and I've worked hard for it." On 16 October 2019, Dunn signed for Grantham Town on a month loan.

He joined Basford United in August 2020. In December 2022, Dunn returned to Grantham Town on loan before being recalled in March 2023.

Statistics

References

2000 births
Living people
English footballers
Association football defenders
Notts County F.C. players
Grantham Town F.C. players
Basford United F.C. players
English Football League players
Northern Premier League players
Southern Football League players